Finitist set theory (FST) is a collection theory designed for modeling finite nested structures of individuals and a variety of transitive and antitransitive chains of relations between individuals. Unlike classical set theories such as ZFC and KPU, FST is not intended to function as a foundation for mathematics, but only as a tool in ontological modeling. FST functions as the logical foundation of the classical layer-cake interpretation, and manages to incorporate a large portion of the functionality of discrete mereology.

Ur-elements (urs) are indivisible
primitives. Every set in  has one or more sets or urs or both as members.

FST’s formal development conforms to its intended function as a tool in ontological modeling. The goal of an engineer who applies FST is to select axioms which yield a model that is one to one correlated with a target domain that is to be modeled by FST, such as a range of chemical compounds or social constructions that are found in nature. The target domain gives the engineer an intuition about the contents of the FST model that ought to be one-one correlated with it. FST provides a framework that facilitates selecting specific axioms that yield the one to one correlation.

FST is thereby not a single theory, but a name for a family of theories or versions of FST, where each version has its own set construction
axioms and a unique model , which has a finite cardinality and all its sets have a finite rank and cardinality. FST axioms are formulated by first-order logic complemented by the member of relation . All versions of FST are first-order theories. In the axioms and definitions, symbols  are variables for sets,  are variables for both sets and urs,  is a variable for urs, and  denote individual urs of a model. The symbols for sets may appear on both .

An applied FST model is always the minimal model which satisfies the applied axioms. This guarantees that those and only those elements exist in the applied model which are explicitly constructed by the selected axioms: only those urs exist which are stated to exist by assigning their number, and only those sets exist which are constructed by the selected axioms; no other elements exist in addition to these. This interpretation is needed, for typical FST axioms which generate e.g. exactly one set  do not otherwise exclude sets such as

Complete FST models
The axioms for complete FST models are extensionality, restriction, singleton sets and union of sets. Extensionality and restriction are axioms of all versions of FST, whereas the axiom for singleton sets is a provisional nesting-axiom (-axiom) and the axiom of union of sets is a provisional union-axiom (-axiom).

 Ax. Extensionality: . Set  is identical to set  iff (if and only if)  and  have the identical members, may these be sets, urs or both.
 Ax. Restriction: . Every set has either a set or an ur as a member. Urs are the only -minimal elements in FST. Every FST set contains at least one ur as the -minimal member on the bottom.
 Ax. Singleton Sets: . The rank restriction in the axiom does the job of the axiom of foundation of traditional set theories: constraining the rank of sets to an assigned finite  entails that there are no non-wellfounded sets, for such sets would have a transfinite rank.
 Ax. Union of Sets: . For instance, if sets  and  exist, the axiom of union of sets states that the set  exists. If sets  and  exist, the axiom states that  exists. If  and  exist, the axiom states that  exists. This axiom is different from the axiom of union of traditional set theories.

Consider some examples.

: One ur  exists. 
: Two urs  exist. 
: One ur  and the set  exist. 

The recursive formula  gives the number of sets in :

In  there are  sets.

In  there are  sets.

FST definitions

FST definitions should be understood as practical naming conventions which are used in stating that the elements of an applied FST model are or are not interrelated in specific ways. The definitions ought not be seen as axioms: only axioms entail existence of elements of an FST model, not definitions. The definition of intersection states that . As  does not exist in the applied model, the definition of intersection may appear to be an axiom. Similarly with all definitions.

 Def. Rank. The rank of a set is the formal analog of the level of an individual. As a convention, the rank of an ur-element is 0. As there is no empty set in FST, the smallest possible rank of a FST set is 1, whereas in traditional set theories the rank of \{\} is 0. Formally:

 is an ur-element.
, where , is defined as: 
, where , is defined as: 

By applying the definition of -member (below) rank can be defined as:
 is an ur-element.
, is defined as 

 Def. Examples: ; . Examples: ; . Therefore in traditional set theories,  holds for every .

 Def. Examples: ; . Examples: ; . Therefore in traditional set theories,  holds for every  where .

 Def. Examples:  (when ); .

 Def. Examples: ; . Disjointness is the contrary of overlap: ; .

 Def. Examples: ; . As the empty set does not exist in FST, the intersection of two disjoint sets does not exist. When ,  is not true for any . In this case, the disjointness relation  can be used: . In traditional set theories the intersection of two disjoint sets {\it is} the empty set:  . If the axiom of restriction were deleted and the existence of the empty set were postulated, this would still not imply that the empty set {\it is} the intersection of two disjoint sets.

 Def. Examples: ; ; .

For instance,  is true in all FST models which contain the set .

 Def. Examples: ; . As the empty set does not exist, it cannot be stated that .

 Def. Cardinality. Cardinality denotes the number of members of a set. Cardinality is defined only for sets: ur-elements do not have a cardinality. E.g.

 is defined as:   
, where , is defined as:   
, where  is defined as: 

 Def. Examples: ; . Power sets in FST do not contain the empty set, and thus . In FST power set is not required in building sets, whereas e.g. in ZF set theory the axiom of power set is essential in building the hierarchy transfinite sets.

 Def. n-Member and Partition Level:

And so forth. 

 Def.  Members.

, where , is defined as: .   

 Def. Partition Set. A partition set that contains all -members of a set is defined as: 

.  
 is defined as: .       
 is defined as: .

 Def. Examples: 

 
  

Definitions that incorporate the functionality of discrete mereology
As transitive theories, Mereology and Boolean algebra are incapable of modeling nested structures. It is therefore intelligible to take FST or another intransitive theory as primary in modeling nested structures. However, also the functionality of transitive theories finds application in modeling nested structures. A large portion of the functionality of discrete mereology (DM) can be incorporated in FST, in terms of relations which mimic DM's relations.

DM operates with structureless aggregates such as  that consists of urs , and  that consists of urs .

A large portion of the functionality of DM can be incorporated in FST by defining a relation analogous to DM's primitive  in terms of FST's membership. Although the identical symbol '' is used with DM and the goal is to mimic DM functionality, FST's  may hold only between elements of a FST model, i.e., nothing is added to the applied FST models. As always, variables  denote FST sets and  denotes an ur-element.

When  holds,  exists in some level of set . For instance,  holds. For instance,  holds. By the definition of proper part, e.g.  and  hold. Fine (2010, p. 579) notes that also chains of relations such as  may be used; such chains have now been given an axiomatic base.

The following translations of DM axioms into the terminology of FST show that FST's  is congenial with DM's axioms of reflexivity, transitivity and discreteness, but that DM extensionality must be modified by changing one of its equivalence relations into an implication. This reminds that FST sets are structural whereas DM aggregates are structureless.Extensionality: .

To illustrate how FST's  can be applied as a structure-neutral relation in talking about structural sets, consider translations of examples (1-2) where only mereology is applied, into (1'-2') where FST's  is be applied together with membership.

1. A handle is a part of a door; a door is a part of a house; but the handle is not a part of the house.:
1'. A handle is a part of a door and a member of a door: handle  door; handle  door. The door is a part of a house and a member of the house: door  house; door  house. The handle is a part of the house but not a member of the house: handle  house; handle  house.:
:

2. A platoon is part of a company; a company is part of a battalion; but a platoon is not a part of a battalion.:
2'. A platoon is part of a company and a member of a company; a company is a part of a battalion and a member of the battalion; a platoon is a part of a battalion but not a member of a battalion.:

Def. m-disjointness:  denoted as  Ø .

Regarding the definitions of -intersection, -union and -difference, in complete FST models all sets  exist. In some incomplete FST models some  do not exist.

Notes

Set theory
Constructivism (mathematics)